The Mananciais de Campos do Jordão State Park is a state park in the state of São Paulo, Brazil.

Location

The Mananciais de Campos do Jordão State Park is in the municipality of Campos do Jordão, São Paulo, near to the municipal seat.
It is in the Paraíba Valley metropolitan region, which is known for its green landscape, cool mountain climate and European architecture.
The region is a tourist destination, particularly in the winter.
The park contains large numbers of exotic pine trees and remnants of secondary forest around the Salto dam.

History

The Mananciais de Campos do Jordão State Park was created by state decree 37.539 of 27 September 1993.
The main purpose of the park is to protect the water sources of the Salto Dam, which provides up to 30% of the water used by Campos do Jordão.
The park protects the headwaters of the Córrego do Coutinho and Ribeirão das Perdizes streams, which form the Sapucaí Guaçu River, a tributary of the Rio Grande.
The Salto Dam was built in 1940 where the two streams meet, and accounts for 60% of the water used by the city.

The park's management is integrated with the Campos do Jordão State Park.
The management plan was due to be finalized by December 2013.
The park is part of the Mantiqueira Mosaic of conservation units, established in 2006.

Notes

Sources

State parks of Brazil
Protected areas of São Paulo (state)
1993 establishments in Brazil